Douglas George Phillips  (born December 4, 1946) is a Canadian businessman and politician and the commissioner of Yukon from 2010 to 2018.

Born in Toronto in 1946, Phillips moved to Whitehorse with his family as a child. He was first elected to the Yukon Legislative Assembly in 1985, serving fifteen years as the Yukon Party MLA for the territorial riding of Riverdale North. He served in the cabinet of Premier John Ostashek, holding the positions of Minister of Tourism, Minister of Education, Minister Responsible for the Women's Directorate, Minister of Justice, and Minister Responsible for the Public Service Commission. He retired from the Legislature in 2000, and was appointed to numerous boards and commissions in the years afterwards. In 2004, he joined the Yukon Land Use Planning Council, and was serving as its chair when he was appointed Commissioner of Yukon by Prime Minister Stephen Harper. He was also the Yukon Administrator (also referred to as the "assistant commissioner") at the time of his appointment.

Phillips's appointment gained wide approval in the territory.

Phillips and his wife, Dale Stokes, have five children and five grandchildren. Phillips is also an adopted member of the Carcross/Tagish First Nation's Deisheetaan clan. Phillips was appointed to the Order of Yukon in 2020.

References

1946 births
Commissioners of Yukon
Living people
Politicians from Whitehorse
Politicians from Toronto
Yukon Party MLAs
Members of the Order of Yukon